Thomas Mackie Burgess (June 6, 1806 – October 17, 1856) was an American politician. He served as second mayor of  Providence, Rhode Island from 1841 to 1852.

Early life
Burgess was born in Providence and graduated Brown University, class of 1822. After graduation, he began to study law, but abandoned this pursuit to become a successful merchant.

Political career
When Providence became a city in 1832, Burgess was elected one of the original members of the Providence Common Council. On the death of the first mayor, Samuel W. Bridgham, in February 1841, Burgess was elected his successor and re-elected annually until 1852.

He was mayor during the Dorr Rebellion (1841–42), a violent free-suffrage movement that promoted voting rights for all men regardless of property ownership. This was a turbulent time when Rhode Island had two separate governors vying to run the state concurrently.

Railroad career
Burgess was president of the Providence, Warren and Bristol Railroad Company. And/or he served as the President of the Boston and Providence Railroad Company.

Personal life

Burgess enjoyed spending winters in Charleston, South Carolina, where he made many lifelong friends.

He married Eliza Howard of Providence in 1831.

Was paralyzed by stroke about two and a half years before his death, then died of a second stroke. He died at his residence, 108 South Main Street, Providence, October 17, 1856.

References

External links 
 
 Mayors of the City of Providence

1806 births
1856 deaths
Politicians from Providence, Rhode Island
Mayors of Providence, Rhode Island
Brown University alumni
Burials at North Burying Ground (Providence)
19th-century American politicians